Leonel Carrión Santiago (born February 15, 1952) is a Venezuelan former Major League Baseball coach who served on the staff of manager Buck Rodgers of the Montreal Expos in  and . Born in Maracaibo, he was also a minor league outfielder who spent 12 seasons (1972–1983) in the Expo organization before becoming a professional coach in 1984.

Carrión entered professional baseball after graduating from Liceo Udón Pérez in Maracaibo. His active career included more than 1,300 games played, all but 241 of them at the Double-A or Triple-A level. In his finest year, 1974, with the West Palm Beach Expos, he batted a career-best .304 in 105 games and was named a Florida State League all-star. He also stole 41 bases in 1976 as a member of the Québec Métros.

As part of his duties with the 1988 Expos, Carrión worked with former shortstop Hubie Brooks, a 1987 All-Star, to convert him into an outfielder.

References

External links

Coach's page from Retrosheet

1952 births
Living people
Cocoa Expos (baseball) players
Denver Bears players
Memphis Blues players
Minor league baseball coaches
Montreal Expos coaches
National League All-Stars
Québec Carnavals players
Quebec Metros players
Sportspeople from Maracaibo
Venezuelan baseball coaches
Venezuelan expatriate baseball players in Canada
Venezuelan expatriate baseball players in the United States
West Palm Beach Expos players
Wichita Aeros players